Jang Jae-Sung (Hangul: 장재성, Hanja: 張在成; born March 15, 1975, in Incheon) is a retired South Korean freestyle wrestler.

Career

Jang first garnered attention in the 1992 World Junior Wrestling Championships, held in Cali, Colombia, where he won the gold medal in the freestyle 63 kg class.

Jang won the silver medal in the freestyle 62 kg class at the 1996 Summer Olympics, where he defeated reigning world champion Elbrus Tedeyev of Ukraine 3–1 in the quarterfinals but lost to Tom Brands of United States 7–0 in the gold medal match.

Jang accumulated another Olympic medal at the 2000 Summer Olympics, where he lost to eventual gold medalist Mourad Oumakhanov of Russia in the semifinals but beat 1997 world champion Mohammad Talaei of Iran in the bronze medal match.

Post career
Jang participated in the 2008 Summer Olympics as an assistant coach of the South Korean national freestyle wrestling team. He currently serves as an assistant coach in the LH Wrestling Club.

External links
Jang Jae-Sung's profile from sports-references

1975 births
Living people
South Korean wrestlers
Olympic wrestlers of South Korea
Wrestlers at the 1996 Summer Olympics
Wrestlers at the 2000 Summer Olympics
South Korean male sport wrestlers
Olympic silver medalists for South Korea
Olympic bronze medalists for South Korea
Olympic medalists in wrestling
Asian Games medalists in wrestling
Wrestlers at the 1994 Asian Games
Wrestlers at the 1998 Asian Games
World Wrestling Championships medalists
Medalists at the 2000 Summer Olympics
Medalists at the 1996 Summer Olympics
Asian Games gold medalists for South Korea
Asian Games silver medalists for South Korea
Sportspeople from Incheon
Medalists at the 1994 Asian Games
Medalists at the 1998 Asian Games
20th-century South Korean people
21st-century South Korean people